The 1907 Ole Miss Rebels football team represented the University of Mississippi during the 1907 Southern Intercollegiate Athletic Association football season. In what would be Mason's final game as head coach, Ole Miss faced rival Mississippi A&M on a cold, wet Thanksgiving Day. Before the second half began, Mason brought out an urn filled with whisky-laced coffee in an attempt to warm his players. Sloppy second-half play resulted in a 15 to 0 Ole Miss loss. After the game, many of the players blamed Mason for the loss and when asked if the team was returning home that night, Mason was quoted as saying "Yes, the team is going north at 11 o'clock. I'm going in another direction, and hope I never see them again!"

Schedule

References

Ole Miss
Ole Miss Rebels football seasons
Ole Miss Rebels football